The Need for a Sacred Science is a 1993 book by the Iranian philosopher Seyyed Hossein Nasr.

See also
 Knowledge and the Sacred

References

Sources

 
 
 

Seyyed Hossein Nasr
Traditionalist School
Metaphysics books
Philosophy books